A babka is a sweet braided bread which originated in the Jewish communities of Poland and Ukraine. It is popular in Israel (often referred to as simply a yeast cake) and in the Jewish diaspora. It is prepared with a yeast-leavened dough that is rolled out and spread with a filling such as chocolate, cinnamon, fruit, or cheese, then rolled up and braided before baking.

History 

Babka developed in the Jewish communities of Eastern Europe in the early 19th century. Extra challah dough was rolled up with fruit jam or cinnamon and baked as a loaf alongside the challah. Chocolate was not originally used, as it was not generally available; the chocolate babka was likely a mid-20th century American development. Its name (though not necessarily the dish itself) may be related to a type of Easter cake popular in Poland and Ukraine known as baba or the diminutive babka, which means "grandmother", related to the Yiddish bubbe.

Although the Polish and Ukrainian babka are mutually eponymous with their Jewish counterparts, the appearance and preparation of each babka is drastically different. The Eastern European babka draws its name from its tall, stout, fluted sides formed in a traditional pan, and reminiscent of a grandma's skirt. In comparison, the variant introduced to Western culture by emigres to New York consists of strands of rich yeasted dough interwoven and baked in a loaf tin.

The Jewish babka was mostly unheard of outside of the Polish Jewish community until the latter part of the 20th century. European-style bakeries started to offer it in late 1950s in Israel and in the US. In addition to chocolate, various fillings including poppy seeds, almond paste, cheese, and others became popular, and some bakers began to top it with streusel.

By the 1970s babka was a widely popular Ashkenazi Jewish delicacy in the greater New York City area.  The most well known commercial bakery is Green's of Brooklyn. Ashkenazi New York Babka is typically more bread loaf shaped, and is different from Israeli Babka, which tends to be flatter and rectangular in form. While likely every Jewish bakery in that period had a Babka on offer, Green's became widely distributed at Kosher markets around the area and to other Jewish American communities till the 2000s and the popularity of babka has continued to increase across the United States.   

In the 2010s,  Israeli style Babka became available in New York.  One example was from a popular Israeli bakery from Tel Aviv owned by Gadi Peleg, Breads Bakery, opened a location and began to sell their Israeli style babka filled with traditional fillings such as cinnamon, as well as non-traditional fillings such as Nutella, apple, and cheesecake, as well as a savory version with za'atar and feta cheese. They won several local awards for their chocolate babka.

Preparation 
It consists of either an enriched or laminated dough; which are similar to those used for challah, and croissants respectively, that has been rolled out and spread with a variety of sweet fillings such as chocolate, cinnamon sugar, apples, sweet cheese, Nutella, mohn, or raisins, which is then braided either as an open or closed plait, topped with a sugar syrup in order to preserve freshness and make the bread moister. It is sometimes topped with a streusel topping.

Variations

Israeli style 

Israeli style babka (עוגת שמרים) is made with a laminated dough, enriched with butter, which is then folded and rolled multiple times to create many distinct layers, similar to that used for Israeli style rugelach, and also croissant dough. Israeli style babka is available with a wider array of fillings and shapes. It is most often shaped into a loaf pan, but it is also sometimes made into individual babkas, a pie-shaped babka, formed into a ring shape, or braided and baked free form or formed into individual twists similar to a cheese straw. The most popular fillings are chocolate which is commonly made with Hashachar Ha'ole (an Israeli chocolate spread), mohn (a sweetened poppy seed paste filling), and sweet cheese typically made with gvina levana. They are rarely topped with a streusel topping. It is typically sweet; however, savory versions are also popular in Israel, often containing labneh and za'atar. It is also often baked as "roses", individual pastries shaped to resemble a rose. They may also be made with a closed plait, versus the more common open plait.

See also 
 Brioche
 Coffee cake
 Lekach – Jewish honey cake
 List of desserts
 Potato babka

References

External links 

 Video of the preparation of chocolate babka

Ashkenazi Jewish cuisine
Cuisine of New York City
Israeli desserts
Jewish baked goods
Jewish breads
Jews and Judaism in Poland
Polish desserts
Sweet breads
Chocolate desserts
Stuffed desserts
Yeast cakes